Southern Wildlife Management is a privately held company, licensed by the Georgia Department of Natural Resources as a Wildlife Control Operator (WCO), based out of Johns Creek, Georgia, United States.  The company consists of licensed wildlife trappers who are trained to remove nuisance wildlife in commercial, industrial or residential settings.  The company also has a wildlife rehabilitation license. This allows the company to be better equipped to handle and deal with the injured or abandoned wildlife and their babies that are encountered on a daily or weekly basis.

Some of the species that Southern Wildlife Management is specialized to deal with are squirrels, rats, bats, beaver, fox, coyote, snakes, bee hives, hornets nests, possum, raccoons, woodpeckers, Canada goose and more.

Wildlife removal regulations
For all WCO's there are rules and regulations that have to be adhered to in order to legally trap and remove certain nuisance wildlife.  Some of these concerns include:

Squirrels - In Georgia squirrels cannot be trapped in a manner which causes them to die (i.e., rat snap traps). According to the Georgia Department of Natural Resources, the squirrels must be released unharmed in their natural habitat.

Rats - All means are legal.

Flying Squirrels - (same as squirrels)

References

External links
 Southern Wildlife Management

Companies based in Fulton County, Georgia